The Karenni States, also known as Red Karen States, was the name formerly given to the states inhabited mainly by the Red Karen, in the area of present-day Kayah State, eastern Burma. They were located south of the Federated Shan States and east of British Burma.

The British government recognised and guaranteed the independence of the Karenni States in an 1875 treaty with Burmese King Mindon Min, by which both parties recognised the area as belonging neither to Burma nor to Great Britain. Consequently, the Karenni States were never fully incorporated into British Burma. The Karenni states formed for a time the "Kayah State" in post-independent Burma, but on 29 April 1959 both the Shan and the Kayah rulers formally surrendered their ruling powers to the Burmese government.

History
There are no historical data on the Karenni States before the 19th century. According to local tradition in the early times of the Karenni states there was a principality led by a  "Sawphya" that was under the over lordship of a Shan prince. This state finally became independent in the 18th century. In the 19th century the Karenni state was divided into five principalities (sawphyas).

British rule in Burma
In 1864 a Karenni prince requested the status of British protectorate for his state, but the British authorities did not show any interest. After the death of this prince in 1869 his two sons renewed the petition claiming that they feared Burmese ambitions on their state.
The British refused again, but agreed to arbitrate before the King of Burma. Since the Burmese monarchy insisted in their demands on the Karenni territories, the British granted recognition to four states, Kyebogyi, Namekan (Nammekon), Naungpale and Bawlake, which became independent under British protection on 21 June 1875. Kantarawadi state, however, remained independent without official protection.

The Karenni States were recognized as tributary to British Burma in 1892, when their rulers agreed to accept a stipend from the British government. An Assistant Superintendent of the Shan States was based at Loikaw as Agent of the British government. He was exercising control over the local Karenni Rulers, being supervised by the Superintendent at Taunggyi.

On 10 October 1922 the administrations of the Karenni states (Bawlake, Kantarawaddy, and Kyebogyi) were placed under the administration of the Federated Shan States, established in 1900.  under a commissioner who also administered the Wa States. This arrangement survived the constitutional changes of 1923 and 1937. By the 1930s, the Mawchi Mine in Bawlake was one of the most important sources of tungsten in the world.

On 27 May 1942, during World War II, nearby Kengtung State was invaded and its capital captured by the Thai Phayap Army. Following a previous agreement between Thai Prime Minister Plaek Phibunsongkhram and the Japanese Empire, in December the same year the Thai administration occupied Kengtung and parts of Möngpan. The annexation by Thailand as Saharat Thai Doem northern province was formalized on 1 August 1943.

Thailand left the territories in 1945, but officially relinquished its claim over the trans-Salween part of Kantarawadi State only in 1946 as part of the condition for admission to the United Nations and the withdrawal of all wartime sanctions for having sided with the Axis powers.

Post-independence Burma
The Constitution of the Union of Burma in 1947 proclaimed that the three Karenni States be amalgamated into a single constituent state of the union, called Karenni State. It also provided for the possibility of secession from the Union after 10 years. In 1952, the former Shan state of Mong Pai was added, and the whole renamed Kayah State, possibly with the intent of driving a wedge between the Karenni in Kayah State and the rest of the Karen people in Karen State, both fighting for independence.

Under the Burmese government control, the states subjected to changes throughout the small state. Resources like the hydropower and mining led to massive military presence around the state; thus, leading many of its people without a home and more problems to arise.  The heavy military presence had created issues that people of the state faces as consequences. Mistreatment of the local people include land taken away by the military, human rights violations like forced labor and sexual violence and overall safety of the people resulting from landmine planted around the state.

States
There were five Karenni states, divided into two regions.

Western Karenni
The Western Karenni States were the four Karenni states located west of the Salween River:
 Kyebogyi, population 9,867 in 1901.
 Bawlake, population 5,701 in 1901.
 Naungpale, population 1,265 in 1901.
 Nammekon, population 2,629 in 1901.

Kantarawadi
Kantarawadi State was also known as "Eastern Karenni". More than half of its territory was located east of the Salween River, an area that was annexed by Thailand during World War II.

See also
 Princely States
 Shan States
 Red Karen

References

External links
 The Imperial Gazetteer of India
 "Gazetteer of Upper Burma and the Shan states"
 Karenni Ethnicity

Former countries in Burmese history
Kayah State
Karen people
18th century in Burma
19th century in Burma
20th century in Myanmar
Military history of Burma during World War II
Military history of Thailand during World War II
States and territories established in the 18th century
States and territories disestablished in 1959
18th-century establishments in Asia
1959 disestablishments in Asia